Ictalurus is a genus of North American freshwater catfishes. It includes the well-known channel catfish (Ictalurus punctatus) and blue catfish (Ictalurus furcatus).

The catfish genome database (cBARBEL) is a database for the genetics of Ictalurus species.

Species 
Currently, 10 species in this genus are recognized:
 Ictalurus australis (Meek, 1904) (Panuco catfish)
 Ictalurus balsanus (D. S. Jordan & Snyder, 1899) (Balsas catfish)
 Ictalurus dugesii (T. H. Bean, 1880) (Lerma catfish)
 Ictalurus furcatus (Valenciennes, 1840) (blue catfish)
 Ictalurus lupus (Girard, 1858) (headwater catfish)
 Ictalurus meridionalis (Günther, 1864)
 Ictalurus mexicanus (Meek, 1904) (Rio Verde catfish)
 Ictalurus ochoterenai (F. de Buen, 1946) (Chapala catfish)
 Ictalurus pricei (Rutter, 1896) (Yaqui catfish)
 Ictalurus punctatus (Rafinesque, 1818) (channel catfish)

Four fossil species also are assigned to this genus:
 †Ictalurus echinatus
 †Ictalurus lambda
 †Ictalurus rhaeas
 †Ictalurus spodius

References

External links
 
 Catfish genome database (cBARBEL)

 

Extant Oligocene first appearances
Catfish genera
Freshwater fish genera
Taxa named by Constantine Samuel Rafinesque